PRC200-SS is an experimental drug of the triple reuptake inhibitor class that was investigated by the Mayo Clinic.

Preclinical toxicology studies of PRC200-SS in cynomolgus monkeys showed dose proportional kidney toxicity, precluding any further drug development.

References 

Serotonin–norepinephrine–dopamine reuptake inhibitors
2-Naphthyl compounds
Amines
Secondary alcohols
Abandoned drugs